Tim Shaughnessy was an American politician and six term Democratic member of the Kentucky Senate, where he represented the 19th district.

Early life and education
Shaughnessy attended Jefferson Community College. He went on to earn his B.S. from the University of Louisville. He then received his MBA from Bellarmine College. Shaughnessy was the recipient of Kentucky Jaycees' "outstanding Young Kentuckian" award in 1978.

Career

Early career
Shaughnessy began his career as legislative aid to Jefferson County Commissioner Jim Malone. In 1982, Shaughnessy was appointed as a member to the newly created charter commission to study a possible local government reorganization. In 1983, the commission voted 17-4 in favor of a city-county merger for Louisville and Jefferson County. Shaughnessy ran as a Democrat for the 30th district of the Kentucky State Legislature, in which he ultimately was defeated by the incumbent and Jefferson Democratic Party Chairman, Tom Burch.

Kentucky Senate
In 1988, Shaughnessy successfully ran against incumbent Kentucky State Senator Harold Haering. After 6 successful elections to the Kentucky Senate, Shaughnessy's political career would come to in end in 2011 when he mysteriously resigned prior to the end of his term without explanation.

Electoral history

References

1957 births
20th-century American politicians
21st-century American politicians
Democratic Party Kentucky state senators
Living people
Politicians from Louisville, Kentucky
University of Louisville alumni
Bellarmine University alumni